Jundiping Subdistrict is a subdistrict and the seat of Wulingyuan District in Zhangjiajie Prefecture-level City, Hunan, China. The subdistrict was reformed through the amalgamation of Suoxiyu Township, Tianzishan Town and the former Jundiping Subdistrict on November 27, 2015. Its seat is Huajuanlu Community.

References

Zhangjiajie
Subdistricts of Hunan
County seats in Hunan